Malyi Sasyk Lagoon, or Small Sasyk, is a salty lagoon in the Tuzly Lagoons group in Tatarbunary Raion of Odessa Oblast, Ukraine. It is located to south from the Shahany Lagoon. The total area of the lagoon is 2.36 km2. The lagoon is connected with the Dzhantshey Lagoon in south.

The touristic village Rasseyka is located on the north-west coast of the lagoon. The lagoon is separated from the Black Sea and also from the Shahany Lagoon by the sandbar with the marine beaches. The continental coast is connected with the sandbar by 6 bridges.

The water body is included into the Tuzly Lagoons National Nature Park.

Sources
 Starushenko L.I., Bushuyev S.G. (2001) Prichernomorskiye limany Odeschiny i ih rybohoziaystvennoye znacheniye. Astroprint, Odessa, 151 pp. 

Tuzly Lagoons